Asset and Content Management may refer to:
Asset management
Content management